Rita rita (Common names: rita (English), রিঠা (Bengali)) is a species of bagrid catfish that is found across southern Asia.  It has been recorded in Afghanistan, Bangladesh, India, Myanmar, Nepal and Pakistan.  It is one of the giants of its genus, growing  a length of 150 cm.  It is commercially fished for human consumption.

R. rita is a sluggish, bottom-dwelling catfish. It inhabits rivers and estuaries, preferring muddy to clear water. It also prefers backwater of quiet eddies.

R. rita is an omnivorous  catfish; the bulk of its diet consists of mollusks. In addition, it feeds on small fishes, crustaceans, insects, as well as on decaying organic matter.

References 
 

Bagridae
Catfish of Asia
Fish of South Asia
Freshwater fish of India
Fish of Afghanistan
Fish of Bangladesh
Fish of Pakistan
Fish described in 1822